Guirrari is a town in the northern Tadjourah region of Djibouti. Its population, with the nomadic and semi-nomadic neighborhoods is estimated at 500 people.

Agriculture
Guirrari is noted for its agricultural and farming industry. Crops grown in the area include vegetables and fruits. Significant investments have been made in the industry.

Climate
Guirrari has a hot arid climate (BWh) by the Köppen-Geiger system.

References

Populated places in Djibouti
Tadjourah Region